Tythrop Park, also known as Tythrop House, is a Grade I–listed 17th-century manor house, set in  of parkland, in Kingsey, Buckinghamshire, England. According to Pevsner the exterior is plain and unpromising, but inside the house he describes the staircase as one of the finest in the county, with "extremely luscious openwork foliage".

The property is noted as having installed an early duck decoy, similar to that at the Boarstall Duck Decoy.

It was bought in 2007 for £12.5 million by Nicholas Wheeler (founder of mail-order shirt company Charles Tyrwhitt), and Chrissie Rucker (founder of The White Company). The couple renovated the property before moving in with their four children.

References

External links
Tythrop Park

Houses completed in the 17th century
Country houses in Buckinghamshire
Grade I listed buildings in Buckinghamshire
Grade I listed houses